Trexler is an unincorporated community in Albany Township in Berks County, Pennsylvania, United States. Trexler is located at the intersection of Pennsylvania Route 143 and Old Philly Pike.

References

Unincorporated communities in Berks County, Pennsylvania
Unincorporated communities in Pennsylvania